"Sour Girl" is a song by Stone Temple Pilots. It was written by singer Scott Weiland and guitarist Dean DeLeo and released as a single from the band's fourth album, No. 4.

Background
Scott Weiland wrote the song about his first wife, Janina Castaneda. They got married in 1994, as Stone Temple Pilots were becoming popular in America. 

"Everyone is convinced that it's about my romance with Mary [Forsberg, second wife]," Weiland writes in his autobiography Not Dead and Not For Sale. "But everyone is wrong. 'Sour Girl' was written after the collapse of my relationship with Jannina [sic]. It's about her. 'She was a sour girl the day that she met me,' I wrote. 'She was a happy girl the day she left me… I was a superman, but looks are deceiving. The rollercoaster ride's a lonely one. I pay a ransom note to stop it from steaming.' The ransom note, of course, was the fortune our divorce was costing me. And the happy state, which I presumed to be Jannina's [sic] mood, was because she had finally rid her life of a man who had never been faithful."

"Sour Girl" also appears on the compilation albums Thank You and Buy This. It was the only Stone Temple Pilots song from No. 4  to reach the Billboard Hot 100, where it peaked at number 78.

Music video
A music video was released to accompany this single and stars Sarah Michelle Gellar, who was a fan of the band, as the female lead. At the time the video was made, Gellar was a popular star thanks to her TV series Buffy the Vampire Slayer and her movies Cruel Intentions and I Know What You Did Last Summer.
The video was directed by David Slade, whose later work includes episodes of Hannibal, and the movie The Twilight Saga: Eclipse. 

The video was nominated for Best Cinematography on MTV Video Music Awards in 2000.

Track listing
"Sour Girl"
"Sex & Violence" (live)
"Sour Girl" (live)

Charts
"Sour Girl" was one of STP's biggest hits since the Core and Purple era. Billboard ranked "Sour Girl" at #88 on its list of the 100 Best Rock Songs of the 2000s. The song peaked at number four on the Billboard Mainstream Rock Tracks chart and number three on the Billboard Modern Rock Tracks chart. To date, this remains to be the band's only entry on the Hot 100.

Awards

|+ Nominations for "Sour Girl"
| style="text-align:center;"|2000
|"Sour Girl"
|MTV Video Music Award for Best Cinematography
|

References

External links
 

2000 singles
Stone Temple Pilots songs
Songs written by Dean DeLeo
Songs written by Scott Weiland
Music videos directed by David Slade
Song recordings produced by Brendan O'Brien (record producer)
1999 songs
Atlantic Records singles